The 12th Army Corps was an Army corps in the Imperial Russian Army.

Composition
12th Infantry Division
19th Infantry Division
12th Cavalry Division

Part of
8th Army: 1914 - 1915
3rd Army: 1915
8th Army: 1915
9th Army: 1915 - 1916
7th Army: 1916 - 1917
8th Army: 1917
7th Army: 1917

Commanders
1876-1877: Pyotr Vannovskiy
1877-1878: Grand Duke Vladimir Alexandrovich of Russia
1879-1881: Pyotr Vannovskiy
1893-1896: Mikhail Batyanov
1904-1905: Vladimir Alexandrovich Bekman
1913-1914: Aleksei Brusilov
1914-1915: Leonid Lesh

References 

Corps of the Russian Empire
Military units and formations established in 1876
Military units and formations disestablished in 1917
1876 establishments in the Russian Empire